Vermilion Pass, elevation , is a high mountain pass in the Canadian Rockies, traversing the continental divide. It connects Kootenay National Park in the province of British Columbia with Banff National Park in Alberta.

See also
 List of Rocky Mountain passes on the continental divide

External links
Entry at Bivouac.com

Banff National Park
Mountain passes of British Columbia
Mountain passes of Alberta
East Kootenay
Canadian Rockies